Nilganj is a village in Barrackpore II CD Block in Barrackpore subdivision of North 24 Parganas district in the state of West Bengal, India. It is close to Kolkata and also a part of Kolkata Urban Agglomeration.

Geography

Location
Chak Kanthalia, Ruiya, Patulia and Bandipur form a cluster of census towns around Titagarh/ Khardaha. Karna Madhabpur, with the CD Block headquarters, is located nearby.

Police station
Khardha police station under Barrackpore Police Commissionerate has jurisdiction over Khardaha Municipal area and Barrackpore II CD Block.

Demographics
As per the 2011 Census of India, Nilganje had a total population of 2,662, of which 1,381 (52%) were males and 1,281 (48%) were females. Population below 6 years was 225. The total number of literates in Nilganje was 2,049 (84.08% of the population over 6 years).

Transport
Nilganj is located at the crossing of the Barrackpore-Barasat Road (part of State Highway 2) and the Nilganj Road.

Bus

Private Bus
 81 Barasat - Barrackpore Fishery Gate
 81/1 Barasat - Rajchandrapur

WBTC Bus
 C29 Barasat - Barrackpore Court
 E32 Nilganj - Howrah Station
 S11 Nilganj - Esplanade
 S34B Barasat State University - Barrackpore Court
 AC10 Nilganj - Howrah Station

Train
The nearest railway stations are Barasat Junction railway station on the Sealdah-Bangaon line and Barrackpore railway station on the Sealdah-Ranaghat line.

Education
St. Mary's Technical Campus Kolkata, a private engineering college, was established at Saibona, near Nilganj, in 2011.

References

Villages in North 24 Parganas district